The Cathedral of Our Lady of Peace or alternatively Cathedral of Trujillo, is a religious building that is affiliated with the Catholic Church and is located opposite the Plaza Bolívar between Bolívar and Colón Avenues in the city of Trujillo, Trujillo municipality of Trujillo State in the Andes of South American country of Venezuela.

The temple is Baroque and follows the Roman or Latin rite and functions as the headquarters of the Diocese of Trujillo (Dioecesis truxillensis in Venetiola) that was created on June 4, 1957, with the papal bull In maximis officii of Pope Pius XII.

The current building dates from 1662 and began construction in 1630. With renovations in 1890, the liberator Simón Bolívar, National hero of Venezuela, conducted negotiations with Bishop Lazo de la Vega in the cathedral. For its equity was declared a national historical monument of Venezuela in 1960.

See also
Roman Catholicism in Venezuela
Cathedral of Our Lady of Peace

References

Roman Catholic cathedrals in Venezuela
Trujillo, Venezuela
Roman Catholic churches completed in 1662
1662 establishments in the Spanish Empire
17th-century Roman Catholic church buildings in Venezuela